

495001–495100 

|-bgcolor=#f2f2f2
| colspan=4 align=center | 
|}

495101–495200 

|-id=181
| 495181 Rogerwaters ||  || Roger Waters (born 1943) is an English musician, one of the founders of Pink Floyd. His solo albums, including Amused to Death and Is This the Life We Really Want?, highlight the social problems of the modern world. He has been involved in human rights activities and projects to help fight extreme poverty and malaria. || 
|}

495201–495300 

|-id=253
| 495253 Hanszimmer ||  || Hans Zimmer (born 1957) is a German film score composer and record producer. He has received four Grammy Awards, three Classical BRIT Awards, two Golden Globes, and an Academy Award for The Lion King (1995). His works include also music for Gladiator, Inception, Interstellar, and nearly 150 other productions. || 
|-id=287
| 495287 Harari ||  || Yuval Noah Harari (born 1976) is an Israeli historian and a tenured professor in the Department of History at the Hebrew University of Jerusalem. His international writing bestsellers focus on the study of free will, human consciousness and intelligence. He is also a proponent of animal rights. || 
|}

495301–495400 

|-bgcolor=#f2f2f2
| colspan=4 align=center | 
|}

495401–495500 

|-bgcolor=#f2f2f2
| colspan=4 align=center | 
|}

495501–495600 

|-bgcolor=#f2f2f2
| colspan=4 align=center | 
|}

495601–495700 

|-bgcolor=#f2f2f2
| colspan=4 align=center | 
|}

495701–495800 

|-id=759
| 495759 Jandesselberger ||  || Jan Desselberger (born 1945) is a Polish astronomy popularizer. He is the author of astronomical broadcasts on Radio Poland Katowice for over 25 years and is the co-author of the Polish Astronomical Calendar || 
|}

495801–495900 

|-bgcolor=#f2f2f2
| colspan=4 align=center | 
|}

495901–496000 

|-bgcolor=#f2f2f2
| colspan=4 align=center | 
|}

References 

495001-496000